Cisco HDLC (cHDLC) is an extension to the High-Level Data Link Control (HDLC) network protocol, and was created by Cisco Systems, Inc.  HDLC is a bit-oriented synchronous data link layer protocol that was originally developed by the International Organization for Standardization (ISO).  Often described as being a proprietary extension, the details of cHDLC have been widely distributed and the protocol has been implemented by many network equipment vendors. cHDLC extends HDLC with multi-protocol support.

Framing
Cisco HDLC frames uses an alternative framing structure to the standard ISO HDLC.  To support multiple protocols encapsulation, cHDLC frames contain a field for identifying the network protocol.

Structure

cHDLC frame structure

The following table describes the structure of a cHDLC frame on the wire.

 The Address field is used to specify the type of packet contained in the cHDLC frame; 0x0F for Unicast and 0x8F for Broadcast packets.
 The Control field is always set to zero (0x00).
 The Protocol Code field is used to specify the protocol type encapsulated within the cHDLC frame (e.g. 0x0800 for Internet Protocol).

SLARP address request–response frame structure
The Serial Line Address Resolution Protocol (SLARP) frame is designated by a specific cHDLC protocol code field value of 0x8035.  

Three types of SLARP frame are defined: address requests (0x00), address replies (0x01), and keep-alive frames (0x02).

The following table shows the structure of a SLARP cHDLC address request–response frame.

 The op-code will be 0x00 for address requests and 0x01 for address responses.
 The Address and Mask fields are used to contain a four-octet IP address and mask. These are 0 for address requests.
 The two-byte Reserved field is currently unused and undefined.

SLARP Keep-Alive frame structure
The following table shows the structure of a SLARP cHDLC keep-alive frame.

 The op-code is 0x02 for keep-alives.
 The sender sequence number increments with each keep-alive sent by this sender.
 The received sequence number is the last sequence number received by this sender.
 The two-byte Reliability field is required to be set to 0xFFFF.

See also
 Point-to-Point Protocol, an Internet Standard defined by RFC 1661 and RFC 1662 that solves the problems Cisco HDLC solves as well as many other problems.

External links
 Serial Line Address Resolution Protocol, IP Addressing: ARP Configuration Guide, Cisco IOS Release 15M&T, December 3, 2012
http://www.nethelp.no/net/cisco-hdlc.txt
http://securitydigest.org/tcp-ip/archive/1990/11#000068
https://web.archive.org/web/20110723160051/http://www.irbs.net/internet/nanog/9610/0459.html

Link protocols
Telecommunication protocols
Year of introduction missing